Andrew Murdoch (born 30 January 1995) is a Scottish footballer who plays as a midfielder for Ayr United. Murdoch previously played for Rangers, Cowdenbeath, Queen of the South and Morton.

Club career

Rangers
Murdoch joined Rangers from Paisley based Everton Boys Club after trials with Dundee United and Celtic.

In April 2013, he played and scored in a friendly match at Ibrox Stadium against Linfield. Just over two weeks later he made his competitive debut against East Stirlingshire as an 80th-minute substitute for Kyle Hutton on 27 April 2013.

Murdoch made only one appearance during the 2013–14 season, in a Scottish League One match against East Fife. Murdoch scored his first competitive goal on 20 February 2015 against Raith Rovers. A few days later he agreed a two-and-a-half-year extension with Rangers that was due to expire in May 2017. Murdoch become a first team regular in the 2014–15 season as Rangers aimed to gain promotion from the Scottish Championship, They finished a disappointing third behind Hearts and Hibernian but qualified for the Premiership Play Offs. Rangers beat Queen of the South and Hibernian to reach the final where they faced 11th placed Scottish Premiership club Motherwell. They were clearly defeated in a 6–1 aggregate loss and would have to remain in the Championship for another season. Murdoch played all the play-off games and for his performances over the season won the Rangers' Young Player of the Year award in May 2015.

The arrival of new manager Mark Warburton saw Murdoch's first-team opportunities limited. On 1 September 2015, he moved to Scottish League One side Cowdenbeath on a six-month loan deal until January 2016.  He made fifteen appearances and scored two goals. On 11 January 2016, Murdoch signed on loan to fellow Championship team Queen of the South on another six-month loan deal until the end of the 2015–16 season. He made ten appearances and scored one goal. Murdoch scored the only goal in a 1–0 win for Queens against Hibernian F.C.|Hibernian, which helped to extend Rangers' lead in the 2015–16 Scottish Championship.

Murdoch was released by Rangers on 31 August 2016.

Greenock Morton
On 23 September 2016, Murdoch signed for Greenock Morton on a contract until 15 January 2017. In November this deal was extended until the end of the season.

After making over 30 starts for Morton in 2016-17, Murdoch signed for another year in May 2017. He made a total of 75 appearances across all competitions and scored 4 goals before he left the club at the end of his contract in 2018.

Ayr United
On 12 July 2018, Murdoch signed a one-year deal with Scottish Championship side Ayr United. He was part of a side that enjoyed a good Scottish League Cup run finishing top of their five team group with a 100% win record with twelve goals scored and only one conceded before defeating Scottish Premiership side Dundee 3-0 in the next round. They were then knocked out in the quarter-final against Murdoch's former club Rangers, losing 4–0. On 25 March 2019, Murdoch signed a new contract at Ayr for the 2019–20 season.

International career
Murdoch represented Scotland once, at under-16 level, in a Victory Shield match against England in 2011.

Career statistics

Honours
Rangers
Scottish Youth Cup (1): 2013-14

References

External links

1995 births
Association football midfielders
Footballers from Paisley, Renfrewshire
Cowdenbeath F.C. players
Greenock Morton F.C. players
Living people
Queen of the South F.C. players
Rangers F.C. players
Scotland youth international footballers
Scottish Football League players
Scottish footballers
Scottish Professional Football League players